The Cobb Building (also known as American Bank) is an American historic commercial building located at 203 East Cherokee Street in downtown Wagoner, Oklahoma.

Description and history 
The structure was completed in 1895, by Samuel S. Cobb to be used for his drug store. It is Wagoner's first brick business building; it was restored and now used by the American Bank. 

It was listed on the National Register of Historic Places on August 13, 1982.

References

Commercial buildings on the National Register of Historic Places in Oklahoma
Buildings and structures in Wagoner County, Oklahoma
National Register of Historic Places in Wagoner County, Oklahoma